Jaber Behrouzi (born 22 August 1991) is an Iranian weightlifter who won the gold medal in the Men's 69 kg weight class at the 2013 Asian Weightlifting Championships.

Major results

References

External links 
 
 

1991 births
Living people
Iranian male weightlifters
Iranian strength athletes
Weightlifters at the 2014 Asian Games
Universiade medalists in weightlifting
Universiade gold medalists for Iran
Asian Games competitors for Iran
Medalists at the 2013 Summer Universiade
21st-century Iranian people